The Academy at Penguin Hall is an independent, college preparatory high school for young women, located in Wenham, Massachusetts, United States. The school was founded in 2015 and serves young women, including the North Shore and the northern region of the Boston metropolitan area.

History 
The stone manor house that serves as The Academy at Penguin Hall's home was originally built in 1929 by architect Harrie T. Lindeberg for Ruby Boyer Miller, a progressive-minded Detroit socialite. Her family owned the Burroughs Adding Machine. Miller summered at Penguin Hall, along with her children. In 1962, Penguin Hall was purchased by the Sisters of Notre Dame de Namur and became a home for educating women. Jim Mullen of Mullen Advertising purchased Penguin Hall in the late 1980s and used it as their headquarters until they relocated to Boston in 2009. Penguin Hall acquired the property in 2016 and opened its doors to the first cohort of students in September 2016. The dedication ceremony for Penguin Hall was attended by Lt. Governor of Massachusetts Karyn Polito as well as State Senators Joan Lovely and Bruce Tarr, and State Representatives Bradford Hill and Lori Ehrlich.

Curriculum
The Academy at Penguin Hall uses an Interdisciplinary curriculum. While The Academy's curriculum includes core academic disciplines such as math and science, many other college-level courses are also on offer, such as Introduction to Russian History, Art and Politics, and Women in History.

Campus
The Academy at Penguin Hall is located in the town of Wenham, Massachusetts, about  North of Boston. Students spend most of their time in the main academic building, which is separated into three different wings:

The Manor House
Abbey Walk
Ruby Lane

Athletics
The Academy at Penguin Hall offers a variety of sports including cross-country, soccer, basketball, volleyball, softball, tennis, and lacrosse. Students also have opportunities to participate in co-op sports with other local schools, including mountain biking, cheerleading, and gymnastics.

Fine and performing arts
The Academy at Penguin Hall's fine and performing arts include a cappella group The Ruby Slippers, choir, drama, art, film, photography, poetry and writing, and rock band. The Drama Club presents a fall play and spring musical each year, with past productions including The House of Bernarda Alba and Shuddersome: Tales of Poe, adapted by Lindsay Price. Members of the Drama Club also participate in the annual The Massachusetts High School Drama Festival.

References

External links

2015 establishments in Massachusetts
Buildings and structures in Wenham, Massachusetts
Educational institutions established in 2015
Girls' schools in Massachusetts
Private preparatory schools in Massachusetts
Private high schools in Massachusetts
Schools in Essex County, Massachusetts